"Sun Queen" is a song by Scottish singer-songwriter and acoustic guitarist Gerry Cinnamon. It was released as a single on 11 October 2019 by Little Runaway Records as the second single from his upcoming second studio album The Bonny.

Music video
A music video to accompany the release of "Sun Queen" was first released onto YouTube on 10 October 2019.

Charts

Release history

References

2019 songs
2019 singles
Gerry Cinnamon songs